David M. Gates (May 27, 1921 – March 4, 2016) was an American ecologist who sounded early warnings that fossil fuels, fertilizers and pesticides posed a potentially fatal threat to the global environment.

Gates was a physicist and ecologist, professor emeritus of biology, University of Michigan. He received his B.S., M.S., and Ph.D. degrees in physics from the University of Michigan.

References

1921 births
2016 deaths
American ecologists
American physicists
American botanists
People from Manhattan, Kansas
 University of Michigan alumni